"Corazón Espinado" (English: "Thorned Heart'") is a song by Latin rock band Santana featuring Latin rock group Maná. The song was written, produced and sung by Fher Olvera, and co-produced by Alex González, and was released on May 30, 2000, as the fifth single from their 17th studio album, Supernatural (1999), and became a top-20 hit in Italy and Spain. It won the "Record of the Year" and "Best Rock Performance by a Duo or Group" at the 2000 Latin Grammy Awards. In addition, Santana and Maná performed the song at the Latin Grammys.

Charts

Release history

Mayré Martínez cover

In August 2006, Latin American Idol winner Mayré Martínez performed the song in the sixth concert, and it became one of her iconic performances, since it was the first time she showcased her whistle register on the show. In February 2007, her official website launched a poll for fans to decide which song they wanted to have as the next radio single from Mayre's debut album, Soy Mi Destino, the winner song was the studio-recorded cover of "Corazón Espinado". In the last few days of July 2007, the song gained heavy radio-airplay in all Latin America. Mayré performed the track in the third workshop episode of the second season of Latin American Idol, where she also presented her first album.

References

1999 songs
2000 singles
Arista Records singles
Latin Grammy Award for Record of the Year
Maná songs
Santana (band) songs
Songs written by Fher Olvera
Sony BMG singles
Spanish-language songs